Román Eduardo Martínez (born March 5, 1988) is an American-born Mexican basketball player for Soles de Mexicali and the Mexico national team, where he participated at the 2014 FIBA Basketball World Cup.

Martinez' grandfather Francisco Martínez competed for Mexico in the 1936 Olympic Games.

References

External links
RealGM profile
New Mexico Lobos profile

1988 births
Living people
2014 FIBA Basketball World Cup players
American men's basketball players
American sportspeople of Mexican descent
Basketball players from Chihuahua
Basketball players from El Paso, Texas
BC Andorra players
Expatriate basketball people in Andorra
CB Gran Canaria players
Liga ACB players
Mexican men's basketball players
Mexican expatriate basketball people in Spain
New Mexico Lobos men's basketball players
Small forwards
Soles de Mexicali players
UB La Palma players